John Samuel Yu  (born 12 December 1934) is a Chinese-born Australian paediatrics doctor who served as CEO of the Royal Alexandra Hospital for Children from 1979 until 1997. He was the Australian of the Year for 1996.

Early life and education
Born in Nanking (now Nanjing, Jiangsu Province), China, he attended Fort Street High School and the University of Sydney in Sydney, Australia. John Yu discovered his passion for paediatric care and after starting work at the Royal Alexandra Hospital for Children in 1961 now called the New Children's Hospital, he eventually rose to become Head of Medicine in the hospital and later Chief Executive in 1979.

Career and later life
He was the chief executive officer of the Royal Alexandra Hospital for Children at the time of its relocation from inner-city Camperdown to Westmead in western Sydney in 1995 (The hospital now uses the name The Children's Hospital at Westmead in addition to its official title), and served as the chancellor of the University of New South Wales from 2000 to 2005.

He was appointed a Member of the Order of Australia in 1989 and was named Australian of the Year in 1996. He was promoted to Companion of the Order of Australia in 2001. In 2019 he was elected a Fellow of the Royal Society of New South Wales.

Yu, as CEO of the Royal Alexandra Hospital for Children, publicly supported a bill introduced by Alan Corbett in the New South Wales Legislative Council to protect children from abuse and excessive physical chastisement. The bill passed in 2001, banning parents striking children above the shoulders (thus preventing neck, head, brain and facial injuries), and requiring that any physical force applied leave only trivial and short-lived signs such as redness (that is, no bruising, swelling, welts, cuts, grazes, internal injuries, emotional trauma, etc.).

References 

1934 births
Living people
Australian paediatricians
Australian chief executives
Companions of the Order of Australia
Recipients of the Centenary Medal
Fellows of the Royal Australasian College of Physicians
Fellows of the Royal Society of New South Wales
Australian of the Year Award winners
Chinese emigrants to Australia
Chancellors of the University of New South Wales
University of Sydney alumni
People educated at Fort Street High School